The Culinary Institute of America (CIA) is an American private college and culinary school specializing in culinary, baking, and pastry arts education. The school's primary campus is located in Hyde Park, New York, with branch campuses in St. Helena and Napa, California; San Antonio, Texas; and Singapore. The college, which was the first to teach culinary arts in the United States, offers associate, bachelor's, and master's degrees, and has the largest staff of American Culinary Federation Certified Master Chefs. The CIA also offers continuing education for professionals in the hospitality industry as well as conferences and consulting services. The college additionally offers recreational classes for non-professionals. The college operates student-run restaurants on its four U.S. campuses.

The school was founded in 1946 in New Haven, Connecticut, as a vocational institute for returning veterans of World War II. With a growing student body, the school purchased a former Jesuit novitiate in Hyde Park in 1970, which remains its central campus. The school began awarding associate degrees in 1971, bachelor's degrees in 1993, and master's degrees in 2018. Additional campuses were opened in the following years: St. Helena in 1995, Texas in 2008, Singapore in 2010, and Napa in 2016.

History 

The New Haven Restaurant Institute was founded on May 22, 1946 in New Haven, Connecticut as a vocational training school for returning World War II veterans.  It was organized by the New Haven Restaurant Association, who positioned Frances Roth and Katharine Angell to lead and develop the school. It was the first culinary college in the United States. With assistance from Yale University, the school purchased the Davies mansion in New Haven's Prospect Hill neighborhood. The first class consisted of sixteen students and the faculty included a dietitian, a baker, and a chef. In 1947 the school was renamed the Restaurant Institute of Connecticut to reflect its growing repute; the school's name was changed again to the Culinary Institute of America in 1951.

Enrollment grew to approximately 1,000 students by 1969, beyond the capacity of its original campus, so the school purchased the St. Andrew-on-Hudson Jesuit novitiate in Hyde Park, New York in 1970. In 1971, the college began awarding associate degrees, and opened its doors in Hyde Park in the following year. From 1974 to 1979, the school built three residence halls, a culinary library, a career planning center, and a learning resources center. From 1982 to 1984, the American Bounty and Caterina de' Medici Restaurants and St. Andrew's Café opened. In 1984, the school's continuing education center (later named the J. Willard Marriott Education Center) opened, and the school improved its teaching kitchens and constructed an experimental kitchen and food laboratory. In 1990, the school opened a baking and pastry facility, named two years later as the Shunsuke Takaki School of Baking and Pastry. In 1993, the school opened its Conrad N. Hilton Library and began offering bachelor's degree programs. In 1995, the school's first branch campus opened, the Culinary Institute of America at Greystone in St. Helena, California. In 1998, the Student Recreation Center was opened.

The Apple Pie Bakery Café opened in 2000, and the Colavita Center opened the following year. More residence halls were built at the school's Hyde Park campus in 2004. In 2005, Anton Plaza opened in Hyde Park while the Ventura Center for Menu Research and Development opened in St. Helena. The school's third campus opened in 2008 in San Antonio. Two years later, the CIA opened a campus in Singapore consisting of a facility on the campus of Temasek Polytechnic. In 2012, the CIA began offering a bachelor's degree program in culinary science, and in 2014 introduced a bachelor's degree in applied food studies. In 2015, the college expanded its recreation center and added a new dining facility for students, called The Egg; both are housed in the CIA's Student Commons building. In the same year, the college acquired a portion of Copia, a museum in downtown Napa, California that operated from 2001 to 2008. In 2016, the college opened a campus, the Culinary Institute of America at Copia, which houses the CIA's new Food Business School. The college, which was outgrowing its St. Helena campus, purchased the northern portion of the Copia property for $12.5 million. In 2018, the CIA launched a Bachelor of Science degree program in Hospitality Management and introduced master's-level education with a Master of Professional Studies degree program in Food Business. In 2019, the college began offering a Master of Professional Studies degree program in Wine Management.

Campuses

Hyde Park, New York 

The school's largest and primary campus operates four public restaurants for students to gain experience. Food served at the American Bounty Restaurant highlights Hudson Valley produce and is prepared in the style of cuisines of the Americas. The Bocuse Restaurant serves traditional French food using modern techniques. It was the first of the school's restaurants, and opened as the Epicurean Room and Rabalais Grill in 1973, before being renamed the Escoffier Restaurant (after Auguste Escoffier) in 1974. In 2012 it was again renamed to honor Paul Bocuse, and given a $3 million renovation by Adam Tihany. The Ristorante Caterina de' Medici is a restaurant with a focus on Italian food. The Apple Pie Bakery Café has a casual atmosphere.

The school also frequently creates on-campus pop-up restaurants, including Post Road Brew House. The second of the campus' pop-ups, the gastropub opened in February 2016 in the General Foods Nutrition Center (formerly St. Andrew's Cafe).

The campus offers intercollegiate, intramural, and club athletics. Its intercollegiate program began in 2004, and is affiliated with the Hudson Valley Intercollegiate Athletic Conference.

Napa County, California 

The CIA has two campuses in Napa County, California. The campus in St. Helena is known as the Culinary Institute of America at Greystone; the other campus, in the city of Napa, is known as the Culinary Institute of America at Copia. The Greystone campus runs associate degree programs, certificate programs, continuing education courses, and custom classes. The Rudd Center for Professional Wine Studies runs wine instruction classes and a certification program for wine professionals.

The campus also operates two restaurants. The Gatehouse Restaurant offers contemporary dishes using regional ingredients, and the Bakery Café by illy serves food  prepared by students in the college's baking and pastry arts degree program. The campus formerly operated the Conservatory Restaurant, which was run by students of the Farm-to-Table concentration of the bachelor's degree program.

The Copia campus was purchased in 2015. The building and grounds were formerly Copia, a museum in downtown Napa that operated from 2001 to 2008. The campus opened in 2016 as the Culinary Institute of America at Copia, to house the CIA's new Food Business School and includes a restaurant, the Restaurant at CIA Copia. Copia also holds food and wine events, classes, and conferences and seminars throughout the year, including the Worlds of Flavor International Conference & Festival.

San Antonio, Texas 

The San Antonio campus is located in Downtown San Antonio's Pearl Brewery, and runs associate degree programs in culinary arts and baking and pastry arts, as well as programs for professionals and food enthusiasts. The campus' restaurant, Savor, serves dishes inspired by ingredients and techniques from around the world. The campus also hosts seminars and conferences for foodservice professionals.

Singapore 
The Culinary Institute of America, with the Singapore Institute of Technology and Temasek Polytechnic, runs its bachelor's degree program in Culinary Arts Management in Singapore to graduates of Polytechnic institutions who have earned diplomas in hospitality, tourism, or culinary arts. Temasek Polytechnic and the CIA constructed a  educational facility with three teaching kitchens to house the programs.

Organization and administration 
The Culinary Institute of America is a nonprofit organization governed by a 24-member board of trustees. These trustees are elected to three-year terms by the Members of the Corporation, the stakeholders of the CIA. Each trustee can serve a maximum of four terms. The board appoints the president and votes on major initiatives for operation of the college, including tuition and fees, nomination of new trustees, operating and capital budgets, planning, major construction projects, and bylaw changes and amendments. The school's board of trustees has 24 members, including Ralph Brennan, Fred Carl, Jr., Thomas Keller, Michael Mina, Robert A. Muh, Charlie Palmer, Roy Yamaguchi, and chairman Jon L. Luther.

The college's president is L. Timothy Ryan, a graduate of the school and its fifth president. The president's cabinet consists of seven vice presidents, the campus's provost, and its chief of staff. There is proportionately a large number of departments, for operating various functions related to foodservice classes and restaurants.

The official school colors are green and gold, chosen as common food colors. The college logo includes a stalk of wheat.

Faculty
The school's full-time faculty number approximately 150. The school differs from most colleges as its faculty is largely composed of chefs. The college employs a number of American Culinary Federation-certified Certified Master Chefs, as well as Master Bakers certified by the Retail Bakers of America. The faculty also includes authors of textbooks, magazines, and other published media. Many of the instructors are graduates of the school.

Academics

Degree programs 
The college offers multiple associate and bachelor's degrees programs, as well as master's degree programs. Each associate and bachelor's program requires a 15-week externship at a CIA-approved foodservice operation. The school's degree programs are accredited by the Middle States Commission on Higher Education.

The Food Business School
In spring 2015, the institute opened the Food Business School for executive and graduate education in business. The school's faculty are instructors at UC Berkeley, Stanford University, and UC Davis; some were chefs, restaurant consultants and other food industry employees. The school involves three separate programs: online classes, 3- or 4-day sessions at the Greystone campus or other areas in the San Francisco Bay Area, and multiple-month-long programs. Tuition varies from $400 for a single course to $4,000 for an "intensive retreat". The program only offers certificates, but not graduate degrees. The school's dean and founder is William Rosenzweig.

Other programs and courses 
The college's New York campus also offers continuing education courses and certificate programs. The California and Texas campuses run several continuing education classes, and the California campus also has programs for wine professionals. A variety of programs for food enthusiasts are run as well at all the U.S. campuses. The college partnered with Epicurious in running an online cooking school featuring a variety of culinary classes. The CIA also runs a certification program called ProChef, a program to recognize culinary and academic skills, as well as familiarity with business practices.

The CIA's California campus also runs an accelerated culinary program for students who already have at least a four-year bachelor's degree in hospitality, food-service, or another related field. The program includes the same basic classes as the school's associate degree programs, however the accelerated program does not include the externship requirement, and several classes are run with a faster-paced curriculum or including more in-depth material.

Conferences and summits 
The CIA holds various conferences, summits, and retreats for professionals in food and related industries, focusing on topics such as world cuisines, flavor development, health and wellness, nutrition science, volume foodservice, sustainability, and technology. These include the Worlds of Flavor International Conference and Festival; Menus of Change; Healthy Kitchens, Healthy Lives; and the Global Plant-Forward Culinary Summit.

Libraries and museums 

The school's Archives and Special Collections department is located in the Hyde Park campus' Conrad N. Hilton Library. Highlights of the collection includes a Roman amphora displayed in the Archives Reading Room, menu covers for New York City's Chanterelle Restaurant which were designed by notable artists, and a 1556 Latin edition of Athenaeus' Deipnosophistae, volume 15.

The Greystone campus maintains the Margie Schubert Library, located adjacent to the school's teaching kitchens.

The CIA also operates a college museum, the Chuck Williams Culinary Arts Museum, at its Copia campus in Napa.

Student body

Admissions 

Undergraduate admission to the Culinary Institute of America is characterized by College Board as "not selective". The Princeton Review, in its 2017 edition, gave the university an admissions selectivity rating of 70 out of 99.

For the freshman class entering Fall 2017, the Culinary Institute of America received 989 applications of which 934 were accepted for a 94% admissions rate. The admitted students' academic profile showed an SAT average score of 970 to 1190, while the average composite ACT score was 17–23. The school began accepting the Common Application in 2016, after becoming a member on August 1 of that year.

Additionally, for the 2016–2017 academic year, the Culinary Institute of America received 443 transfer applications of which 98% were accepted, and 70% enrolled. The Culinary Institute of America admits all students on a need-blind basis.

Enrollment

In Fall 2016, the university had an enrollment of 2,774 undergraduate students (including 512 first-year students) and 19 graduate students. Of all students, 32% are from the state of New York and 12.2% are international students, from 37 countries. The student body has an average age of 22 years. 57% of students were in the top half of their high school class rank, with 6% in their class's top tenth. The average high school GPA was 3.10. 443 students applied to transfer to the CIA, with a 98% admission rate and 72% enrollment rate for those admitted. 82% of first-year students lived in college housing, while 61% of all undergraduates lived in college housing. 100% of the student body is enrolled as full-time students.

In 2014, undergraduates were enrolled in five schools: the School of Culinary Arts, the School of Baking and Pastry Arts, the School of Business and Management, the School of Liberal Arts and Food Studies, and the School of Culinary Science and Nutrition. Within the bachelor programs, 83% of student majors are in business management, 10% in culinary science, and 6% are interdisciplinary.

, associate and bachelor's degree tuitions are $14,315 per semester ($28,630 per year). Other charges vary per campus. With board, supplies, and fees, the first semester is typically about $17,200, with later semesters around $16,500. Room fees vary, with New York per-semester rates from $3,210 for a double-occupancy room to $4,085 for a single. In California, on-campus quads or triples are $3,200, doubles are $3,800, and singles are $4,700. Tuition and residence hall rates are set to increase in July 2017. In 2017, the Princeton Review estimated the average annual total for a student before aid was $46,846, and cost per credit hour before aid was $955. The average need-based financial aid was $13,950, and 100% of students judged to have financial need received aid; 64% of the student body. The average need-based loan was $3,825, and the average loan debt per graduate was $51,200. 88% of graduates were offered full-time employment within six months, with an average starting salary of $33,754 per year. Average earnings from on-campus employment were $2,355; the school offers federal and other work study accommodations.

Publications 
mise en place is the college's newsletter for alumni. The newsletter aims to improve the relationship between the school and its alumni by providing information of interest about the college, its alumni, and students; covering of major issues and events concerning the college; and featuring the leadership and contributions of the school's alumni.

La Papillote, the school's student newspaper, was established in 1979. The newspaper's stated purpose is to report the news of the institution to the students and other members of the campus community. The newspaper also examines contemporary issues of the industry and other topics. The school's student life department oversees production of the newspaper and fills its editor-in-chief position, which is held by a current student. The paper uses submissions from students, chefs, and outside professionals.

Branding 
The CIA has a brand licensing program that sells branded products for foodservice operations and households, and it also publishes cookbooks for professional and home use. The school's general cookbook, The Professional Chef also has an interactive iPad edition that PC Magazine called "a new frontier for books." During the late 1990s, the CIA produced the PBS television show Cooking Secrets of the CIA.

Events 
Beginning in April 2007, the school hosts the CIA Leadership Awards event annually to honor people for success and achievements in the foodservice industry. The events are organized as fundraising dinners, with CEOs and other prominent members of the industry attending, sponsoring student scholarships. At the Leadership Awards event, the school issues the Augie Award, named for Auguste Escoffier, the French chef and restaurateur who popularized and modernized French cuisine. In 2017, Shep Gordon, Jacques Pépin, and Martha Stewart were each recipients of the award.

In 2017, the CIA began hosting its Thomas Keller Golf Classic, a golf outing and fundraiser for student scholarships. The school hosted the inaugural event on June 17 at Silverado Resort and the school's Copia campus in Napa County, near Keller's restaurant the French Laundry.

Criticism

On April 23, 2008, amid complaints directed toward CIA president Tim Ryan, the school's teachers' union approved a vote of no confidence, with a vote of 85 to 9. The faculty described poor equipment, falling academic standards, and little support in the administration for complaints as causes. The largest complaints, laid out in a thirteen-item list, included outdated technology, poorly-designed uniforms, poor-quality classes and dining hall meals, excessive tuition, students admitted with no chance of succeeding, substandard school-brand kitchen equipment, overcrowded classes and residence halls, complicated schedules, and poor record-keeping. The document described President Ryan as taking an autocratic style, ignoring staff input, and retaliating against criticism. Ryan later met with union representatives and described coming improvements in scheduling and curriculum. Immediately after the faculty's vote of no confidence, the board of trustees unanimously voted to their confidence and support of Ryan and extended his contract.

Following the approval, students began organizing a protest, including creating several student groups on Facebook, and hanging "Fire Tim Ryan" signs in dorm rooms. The students described further complaints including the administration's close ties with the corporate food industry and less challenging kitchen tasks, such as frying frozen waffle fries. In May the school prevented the campus newspaper, La Papillote, from writing about the issue, which prompted its editor to resign. The school later apologized and reportedly allowed a full report in the paper's next issue. Ryan held that he was trying to prevent students from being involved in a conflict between the faculty and administration.

On April 23, 2013, about 90 students held a walkout and protest in objection to a recent trend of declining enforcement of educational standards. The policy, requiring applicants to have professional kitchen experience, has varied from three months to a year, and is currently six months; a 2011 revision allowed front-of-house service to count for the requirement. The protesting students signed letters to teachers and the school administration, gave speeches, and donned name tags with their student loan debt written on them.

On September 27, 2015, the Culinary Craft Association (CCA), a union at the school, protested the CIA's outsourcing of jobs. Previously in 2015, the school had terminated 40 jobs in its dishwashing, stewarding, and cleaning departments, forcing them to reapply for jobs with cut wages and benefits. Later that year, CCA joined the Service Employees International Union (SEIU) Local 200United, members of which also protested in September 2015. The school was also demanding CCA cut ties with SEIU in order for the union workers to keep their jobs. On September 22, 2017, CCA held another protest; 17 of the 45 workers represented in the union are scheduled to be laid off and replaced by workers of LCS Facility Group. The workers are in grounds-keeping, recycling and painting at the school, where most of them have been employed for at least 20 years.

In November 2017, soon after the Weinstein effect began and because of it, The Washington Post reported on a student who criticized the school's handling of sexual assault. She was the victim of an attempted rape on the CIA's campus. The victim and attacker were scheduled to work together at an on-campus restaurant soon after the attack, and after the victim's complaint, she nevertheless had to work with him that subsequent weekend. After they were scheduled together again, she quit working there. At the same time, one of the school's deans informed her the school dismissed her complaint as the attack did not violate the school's harassment, sexual misconduct and discrimination policy. The victim said that the school also mentioned that because the victim escaped, no violation occurred.

Notable people 

The CIA has approximately 50,000 graduates in the culinary industry. Some of the college's notable alumni include:

 Grant Achatz
 John Besh
 Richard Blais
 Jérôme Bocuse
 Anthony Bourdain
 David Burke
 Anne Burrell
 Michael Chiarello
 Roy Choi
 Mike Colameco
 Scott Conant
 Cat Cora
 Dan Coudreaut
 Rocco DiSpirito
 John Doherty
 Steve Ells
 Todd English
 Dean Fearing
 Susan Feniger
 Larry Forgione
 Amanda Freitag
 Duff Goldman
 Johnny Iuzzini
 Vikas Khanna
 Spike Mendelsohn
 Michael Mina
 Rick Moonen
 Sara Moulton
 Rajat Parr
 Charlie Palmer
 L. Timothy Ryan
 Walter Scheib
 Barton Seaver
 Michael Smith
 Kerry Simon
 Michael Symon
 Roy Yamaguchi
 Geoffrey Zakarian

In popular culture 
Several books have been written about the school. Journalist Michael Ruhlman, in his first book about the CIA, The Making of a Chef, documents his experiences as he passes through the classes at an accelerated rate. In another book, The Soul of a Chef, he documents seven chefs taking the ACF Master Chef test held there semi-annually. Kitchen Confidential by Anthony Bourdain also features an in-depth discussion of the author's education at the CIA. The book Beaten, Seared, and Sauced: On Becoming a Chef at The Culinary Institute of America by Jonathan Dixon, provides a first-hand experience of a student's experiences at the CIA. The 1995 film Heavy was partially filmed at the school, using interiors and exteriors of its buildings. In 2015, the SyFy show Ghost Hunters filmed an episode about the school's Hyde Park campus.

Explanatory notes

References

Further reading 
  About education at the Culinary Institute of America.
  About the author's experiences in classes at the school..
  About the ACF Master Chef test held at the school.

External links 

 

 
Singapore
1946 establishments in Connecticut
Cooking schools in the United States
Educational institutions established in 1946
Hospitality schools in the United States
Hyde Park, New York
Universities and colleges in Dutchess County, New York
Private universities and colleges in New York (state)
U.S. Route 9
Tourist attractions in Dutchess County, New York
USCAA member institutions